Coalgate is a small town in the Selwyn District of the Canterbury region of New Zealand's South Island. It is located roughly an hour west of Christchurch on State Highway 77.  The town's name stems from it being the "gateway" to the lignite coal fields around Whitecliffs, the Rakaia Gorge, and The Acheron River.  Coal mining declined in the 20th century and has now ceased, but since the 1950s, commercial processing of nontronite has taken place in Coalgate.

Demographics
It is part of the Glentunnel statistical area. 

Coalgate had a population of 339 at the 2018 New Zealand census, an increase of 24 people (7.6%) since the 2013 census, and an increase of 111 people (48.7%) since the 2006 census. There were 138 households. There were 165 males and 174 females, giving a sex ratio of 0.95 males per female, with 75 people (22.1%) aged under 15 years, 51 (15.0%) aged 15 to 29, 165 (48.7%) aged 30 to 64, and 51 (15.0%) aged 65 or older.

Ethnicities were 98.2% European/Pākehā, 8.0% Māori, and 0.9% Pacific peoples (totals add to more than 100% since people could identify with multiple ethnicities).

Although some people objected to giving their religion, 65.5% had no religion, 23.9% were Christian, 0.9% were Buddhist and 1.8% had other religions.

Of those at least 15 years old, 45 (17.0%) people had a bachelor or higher degree, and 69 (26.1%) people had no formal qualifications. The employment status of those at least 15 was that 159 (60.2%) people were employed full-time, 39 (14.8%) were part-time, and 6 (2.3%) were unemployed.

Services 

Notable features are the Coalgate Tavern and the Coalgate Cabins, both situated on the main road to Hororata. Coalgate also has a walkway through the old Coalgate Domain. In addition to these there is also a Coalgate bowling green. A garage is also located in Coalgate.

The town has access to the Selwyn River and is situated to the east of Glentunnel.

Transport 
On 3 November 1875, the Whitecliffs Branch railway was opened, with a station in Coalgate.  It was here that a private line diverged from the state-operated New Zealand Railways Department network.  On 31 March 1962, the railway closed, but some of the line's old formation and the Coalgate station platform can still be found.

Coalgate is serviced by State Highway 77/Inland Scenic Route 72.

References

Selwyn District
Populated places in Canterbury, New Zealand